Gel-e Sefid Rural District is a rural district (dehestan) in the Central District of Langarud County, Gilan Province, Iran. At the 2006 census, its population was 5,347, in 1,753 families. The rural district has 10 villages.

References 

Rural Districts of Gilan Province
Langarud County